Martin Simard (born June 25, 1966) is a Canadian former professional ice hockey player.  He played 44 National Hockey League games for the Calgary Flames and Tampa Bay Lightning.

Playing career

Born in Montreal, Quebec, Simard was not chosen in the NHL Entry Draft. Simard turned professional in 1987 by signing with the Flames.  He spent four years in the Flames organization before getting a call up to the NHL in 1990–91  In 32 games played with the Flames over the next two seasons, Simard recorded one goal and five assists. He played seven more games with the Lightning in 1992–93 before returning to the minors to finish out his career.  Simard retired following the 1997–98 season.

Career statistics

Regular season and playoffs

References

1966 births
Living people
Atlanta Knights players
Calgary Flames players
Canadian expatriate ice hockey players in the United States
Canadian ice hockey left wingers
Cornwall Aces players
Granby Bisons players
Halifax Citadels players
Hull Olympiques players
Ice hockey people from Montreal
Milwaukee Admirals players
Providence Bruins players
Quebec Remparts players
Salt Lake Golden Eagles (IHL) players
Springfield Falcons players
Tampa Bay Lightning players
Undrafted National Hockey League players